Amol Ramsing Kolhe is an Indian actor turned politician who is the current Member of Parliament in the Lok Sabha from Shirur and member of the Nationalist Congress Party.

Early life 
Kolhe was born in the town of Narayangaon in Pune district. He attended Apte School in Pune from 9th to 12th grade. After High school, he earned a MBBS degree from King Edward Memorial Hospital and Seth Gordhandas Sunderdas Medical College, Mumbai.

Acting career 
He is popular for his role of Chhatrapati Shivaji in Marathi TV Shows Raja Shivchatrapati which aired on Star Pravah and Swarajya Janani Jijamata which aired on Sony Marathi as well as Chhatrapati Sambhaji in Marathi TV Series Swarajyarakshak Sambhaji on Zee Marathi. In 2017 he played the controversial role of Nathuram Godse in the film Why I Killed Gandhi.

Political career 
Kolhe was a star campaigner for Shiv Sena in 2014 Indian General Election, but joined Nationalist Congress Party in February 2019. In 2019 Indian general election, he defeated Shivajirao Adhalarao Patil of Shiv Sena and was elected as a Member of Parliament from Shirur.

Filmography

Television

References

External links
Official biographical sketch in Parliament of India website

India MPs 2019–present
Lok Sabha members from Maharashtra
Living people
Shiv Sena politicians
Nationalist Congress Party politicians
Male actors in Marathi television
People from Pune district
Indian actor-politicians
1980 births
Indian male film actors